Patania concatenalis is a moth in the family Crambidae. It was described by Francis Walker in 1866. It is found in Darjeeling, India.

References

Moths described in 1866
Moths of Asia
Spilomelinae
Taxa named by Francis Walker (entomologist)